Christ the King Church is a Roman Catholic Parish church in the Wimbledon Park area of Wimbledon in the London Borough of Merton. It was founded in 1913, and built in 1926 by the Society of Jesus. The architect was Adrian Gilbert Scott.

History
In 1877, The Jesuits came to Wimbledon at the request of Edith Arendup, a member of the Courtauld family, from Roehampton where they had their novitiate, Manresa House. In 1887, she commissioned the building of Sacred Heart Church, Wimbledon. From that church the Jesuits ministered to the Catholics of the area. From 1913, Fr Ignatius O'Gorman SJ travelled to the Catholics in the Wimbledon Park area.

Originally, the rector of the Sacred Heart Church only allowed one Sunday Mass to be said in the area. In 1926, the rector and the Bishop of Southwark, Peter Amigo allowed for Fr O'Gorman to have the church built. Adrian Gilbert Scott designed the church and it was completed in 1928. The church, a chapel of ease of Sacred Heart Church was going to be dedicated to Saint Austin, but in 1925, Pope Pius XI instituted the Feast of Christ the King, so the church was dedicated to Christ the King. The church hall remained dedicated to St Austin.

In 1955, the church ceased to be a chapel of ease and became a parish church. The first parish priest was Fr Jordan SJ. In 1959, administration of the church was handed over by the Jesuits to the Diocese of Southwark who continue to serve the parish.

Parish
The church has five Sunday Masses. One is at 6:00pm on Saturday evening, at 8:30am and 10:30am on Sunday morning and at 5:30pm on Sunday afternoon. There is also a Mass in Polish at 12:45pm every Sunday. There are weekday Masses at 9:30am from Monday to Saturday.

Interior

See also
 List of Jesuit sites
 Sacred Heart Church, Wimbledon

References

External links
 
 Christ the King Parish site

Roman Catholic churches in the London Borough of Merton
Roman Catholic churches completed in 1928
20th-century Roman Catholic church buildings in the United Kingdom
Churches in the Diocese of Southwark
Italianate architecture in England
1928 establishments in England
Adrian Gilbert Scott buildings
Italianate church buildings in the United Kingdom